Padma Rao Nagar, sometimes also called PR Nagar, is a locality in Secunderabad, India, named after Diwan Bahadur Padma Rao Mudaliar. It was the early communities like Mudaliars who started developing the Secunderabad Cantonment commercially. Otherwise, Secunderabad had only large number of tents housing the troops of the British army as told by Mr. Luther in book Lashkar - 200 Years Of Secunderabad.  The Mudaliars, who were camp followers of the British, made immense contributions for the growth of education and health care and explained the growth of the Secunderabad Club from a public room. Apart from that Padmaraonagar was also the childhood residence of Anirudh kasyap Sesham, and Paraag Patel Surani. In an apartment called Sai geeta lok was where they started the once epic and gargantuan brand of the twin cities called Hyderabadi Studios. Due to differences between the founders, the studio had to be shut down and the founders got busy with other stuff later on in life. It was previously known as Walker Town during the British raj.

It is bordered by Musheerabad, Chilkalguda,  Sitaphalmandi and Bhoiguda areas of Secunderabad in the southern Indian state of Telangana.

Landmarks
The major landmarks in this area are the Skandagiri;Polbal Hanuman temple; Sai Baba temple, Sardar Patel College, Dundoo Mansion, Finline Residency, Conjeevaram House, the government's Gandhi Medical College & Hospital (earlier the land was used for Musheerabad Jail) as well as the Swarajya Press, which has now been converted into an auditorium for ceremonies. Balram compound, Legend Serene, Belvedere Gardens and Lucky's Restaurant are some of the new well-known landmarks.

The Shirdi Sai Baba temple in Walker town, Secunderabad attracts devotees from all over Secunderabad as well as Hyderabad. The temple was founded by Sri Sri Sai Kumar Babaji. Aarti is performed twice a day in the holy shrine.

The famous Sri Subrahmanyaswamy Temple, Skandagiri, Secunderabad, with Lord Murugan as the presiding Deity, is close by. This Temple celebrates many important festivals throughout the year attracting devotees in large numbers. Special mention is to be made of festivals like Sri Vinayaka Chaturthi, Sankatahara Chaturti for Sri Sundara Vinayagar, Aadi Krithigai, Sri Subbaraya Sashti, Mahaskanda Sashti, Thai Poosam. Panguni Uttiram, and other festivals for Sri Subrahmanyaswamy and Pradhosha Poojas, Mahasivarathri, Maharudrams performed during the Kartika months for Lord Ekambareswarar, Vasantha Navarathri and Sharadha Navarathri festivals for Sri Jaya Durga & Sri Kamakshi Amman.
This temple is a tribute to the public spirit of devotion and continued patronage. The devotees swell in number day-by-day and that speaks immensely of the Divine Grace of the Supreme Almighty enshrined on this hillock.
 Sri Subrahmanyaswamy Devalayam, Skandagiri, Secunderabad, Official Website

Commercial area
Padmarao Nagar provides the urban dweller with all the necessities including supermarkets like Nilgiris, Heritage Fresh, Kankani, Ushodaya shopping complexes, ATMs, restaurants like Lucky's Restaurant, tiffin centres, medical and general stores, public parks, Gandhi Hospital, Pulse Hospital, places of worship like the famous Skandagiri Temple, schools, colleges like Sardar Patel College, major banks like Andhra Bank, State Bank of Hyderabad, SBI, Indian Overseas Bank, HDFC and ICICI Bank. Gandhi Medical College is ranked as the best medical college in the state of Telangana, and among the top 20 in India.

Transport
Padmarao Nagar is just a ten-minute walk from the Bhoiguda exit of the Secunderabad Railway Station. The major intracity buses run by TSRTC ply through this area are : 1P (Rathifile to Afzal Gunj), 2P (Rathifile to Jiyaguda), 20P (Rathifile to Nampally) and 44 (Parsigutta to Parsigutta]] , 40 number bus from KOTI to secunderabad railway station.

The closest MMTS Train station is at Sitaphalmandi and the nearest metro station is Secunderabad East, though there are plans of adding a metro station at Gandhi Hospital.

Famous people

Padmarao Nagar is home to many actors and directors such as Sekhar Kamula (director of happy days),narsimha rao (supporting roles in many Telugu films), Duvvasi mohan (comedian in many films) he has a flat in gharonda court on padmaraonagar main road on which is padmaraonagar park. Also famous Advocate Chinthalapudi Suryanarana Rao and Gemini TV anchor and artist Kavitha Rao lived here. Including this Hyderabadi studios a very famous youtube channel founded by Anirudh kasyap sesham and paraag patel surani is headquartered in sai geeta lok apartments.

Recreation

The main attraction of this area is the Padmarao Nagar Park which is next to the Padmarao Nagar bus stop. The park provides fresh and clean air and is well organized with good maintenance. Immediately outside Padmarao Nagar, near the station side exit is also the eatery 'Naivedyam' which serves exclusively vegetarian delicacies from all corners of India. The erstwhile Gharonda Food Court and Swaad have been demolished. Famous eateries in this locality include Lucky's Restaurant, 1D Cafe, The Joint, Park Dosa and Balaji Restaurant. Towards Abhinav Nagar near the Hanuman Temple is the Ganesh Tiffins which serves Delicious breakfast .

Padmarao Nagar is well connected between Secunderabad and Hyderabad. In fact, Padmarao Nagar main road ends at the crossroads of Musheerabad which draws a virtual line dividing Hyderabad to Secunderabad. A very old Hanuman Temple can be found on the Padmarao Nagar main road, towards Musheerabad.

A new layout which emerged off the Padmarao Nagar main road in 1984 was named Abhinava Nagar. This layout was previously used as farm land for growing quality leafy vegetables. Eventually, this layout housed the renowned Telugu University for a few years before a CRPF camp was established in the buildings, which is now replaced by the Pulse Hospital .

A popular reference on the North East of Padmarao Nagar used to be Tungabadra Industries (known by locals as Dalda factory), other local references being Dundoo compound and Chungi compound. Chungi compound in particular, has an old mansion of the Nizams times still in place, a reminder of their rule.

Gandhi Hospital, presently opening into Padmarao Nagar, was Musheerabad's Central Jail compound previously. Gautam Soap Factory was also a reference point on Padmarao Nagar main road.

Padmarao Nagar is a cul-de-sac between Secunderabad and Hyderabad. Upper-middle-class people continue to live here.  The community used to be extremely calm and quiet, until Gandhi Hospital emerged. Housing and commercial prices have always been high in this area because of its proximity to Secunderabad Railway Station, a 20-minute drive to the erstwhile domestic airport (at Begumpet), 10-minute drive to the famous Tank Bund (Hussain Sagar) and 10-minute drive to RTC X Roads which houses a cluster of Cinema Theaters.

Despite the construction of the hospital, the area continues to remain relatively peaceful. Residential complexes like Gharonda, Belvedere Gardens and Pawan Towers in the area are very good. Legend Serene is one of the most luxurious apartment built by Legend Builders near Sivanand Ashram. Padmarao Nagar is infamous for its large monkey population, which are known to cause havoc in the residential complexes.

It is also famous for reading rooms for students preparing for Medical and other competitive exams. A large number of medical students live in this area. Many national PG medical coaching institutes like PGIAMS, DBMCI and PRIME have their Hyderabad offices in Padmarao Nagar.

References

Neighbourhoods in Hyderabad, India